2009 Continental Championships may refer to:

Asian Championships
 Football (soccer): AFC Champions League 2009
 Multisport: 2009 Asian Indoor Games
 Multisport: 2009 Asian Youth Games
 Athletics: 2009 Asian Championships in Athletics
 Swimming: 2009 Asian Swimming Championships, held November 25–28, 2009 in Foshan, China

European Championships
 Athletics: 2009 European Indoor Championships in Athletics
 Basketball: EuroBasket 2009
 Figure Skating: 2009 European Figure Skating Championships
 Football (soccer): UEFA Champions League 2008-09
 Football (soccer): UEFA Cup 2008-09
 Football (soccer): 2009 UEFA Women's Championship 
 Football (soccer): 2009 UEFA European Under-17 Football Championship
 Football (soccer): UEFA Women's Cup 2008-09
 Volleyball: Men's CEV Champions League 2008-09
 Volleyball: Women's CEV Champions League 2008-09

Oceanian Championships
 Football (soccer): OFC Champions League 2008-09

Pan American Championships / North American Championships
 Football (soccer): CONCACAF Champions League 2008-09
 Football (soccer): 2009 CONCACAF Gold Cup

South American Championships
 Football: 2009 South American Youth Championship
 Athletics: 2009 South American Championships in Athletics

See also
 2009 World Championships (disambiguation)
 2009 World Junior Championships (disambiguation)
 2009 World Cup (disambiguation)
 Continental championship (disambiguation)

Continental championships